Alberto Franceschini (born  26 October 1947) is a founder and former leading member of the Italian far-left organization, the Red Brigades (Brigate Rosse), along with Renato Curcio, Margherita Cagol and Mario Moretti.

Biography
Franceschini was born in Reggio Emilia into a communist family. His father had been arrested for anti-fascist activities in the 1930s, and his grandfather was one of the founders of the Italian Communist Party. At a young age he became a member of the Italian Communist Youth Federation.

The Red Brigades were formed in the second half of 1970 as a result of the merger of Renato Curcio's Proletarian Left and a radical student and worker group. They went completely underground and organized the Red Brigades and spent the next three years, from 1972 to 1975, engaging in a series of bombings and kidnappings of prominent figures. Franceschini was captured and imprisoned for setting up an armed band, setting up a subversive association and kidnapping in 1974. He was released in 1992.

References

1947 births
Living people
People from Reggio Emilia
Italian communists
Anti-revisionists
Red Brigades
Italian prisoners and detainees